Siling Lake, (also known as Qilin) is a lake in the Tibet Autonomous Region, China to the north of Xainza. Doijiang is located near the lake. Administratively it belongs to Xainza County and Baingoin County of the Nagqu. 

Bangecuo is another nearby salt lake located east of Siling Lake, around four miles away.

Overview
It is a salt lake. It is fed by the rivers Za'gya Zangbo (or Tsagya Tsangpo) (扎加藏布) and the Boques Tsangpo (波曲藏布).
The  reserve was established in 1993 and contains significant populations of black-necked cranes and some 120 species of birds in total. The lake only has a single species of fish, Gymnocypris selincuoensis, exploited by fishermen. The prairie on the banks of the lake is traditionally used as grazing land for yaks and sheep.

Climate

See also
 Bangecuo
 Dazecuo
 Gomang Co
 Lake Urru

References

External links
Siling Co

Lakes of Tibet
Xainza County
Ramsar sites in China
Saline lakes of Asia